A Smoked Husband is a 1908 American silent short comedy film directed by D. W. Griffith.

Cast
 John R. Cumpson as Mr. Bibbs
 Florence Lawrence as Mrs. Bibbs
 Linda Arvidson as Maid
 George Gebhardt as Man in Top Hat
 Robert Harron as Messenger
 Arthur V. Johnson as Policeman
 George Nichols
 Alfred Paget
 Mack Sennett as Man in Top Hat
 Harry Solter as Maid's Accomplice
 Kate Toncray as Mother

References

External links
 

1908 films
1908 comedy films
1908 short films
Silent American comedy films
American silent short films
American black-and-white films
Films directed by D. W. Griffith
American comedy short films
1900s American films